The Women's 3 × 5 kilometre relay cross-country skiing event was part of the cross-country skiing programme at the 1968 Winter Olympics, in Grenoble, France. It was the fourth appearance of the event. The competition was held on 16 February 1968, at Autrans.

Results

References

Women's cross-country skiing at the 1968 Winter Olympics
Women's 4 × 5 kilometre relay cross-country skiing at the Winter Olympics
Oly
Cross